A list of windmills in Vendée, France.

External links
French windmills website

Windmills in France
Vendee
Buildings and structures in Vendée